Aliabad-e Hufel (also Romanized as ‘Alīābād-e Hūfel) is a village in Allah-o Akbar Rural District, in the Central District of Dasht-e Azadegan County, Khuzestan Province, Iran. At the 2006 census, its population was 391, in 47 families.

References 

Populated places in Dasht-e Azadegan County